Dennis Gahagan (born c.1817) was an immigrant in the Mexican Pueblo de San Diego in territorial California, and early settler in the City of San Diego in the new U.S. state of California.

History

Mexican–American War
Dennis Gahagan was born c. 1817 in Ireland. He emigrated to the United States in the early 1840s. He joined the U.S. Army, which was recruiting for the Mexican–American War.

He arrived in San Diego by 1849 as a soldier with the First U.S. Artillery (Magruder's Battery). He and his fellow troops fought and patrolled in the Southern California countryside during the war.

U.S. territorial period
In 1849 Gahagan was elected U.S. Judge of the 1st Instance of the District of San Diego.  From 1849 to 1850 Gahagan was an Alcalde (Mayor) of San Diego.

References
 1850 Census, San Diego, California, p. 273A

See also
List of pre-statehood Mayors of San Diego, California

American judges
American military personnel of the Mexican–American War
People from San Diego
Irish emigrants to the United States (before 1923)
1817 births
Year of death missing
History of San Diego